Capital Community College is a public community college in Hartford, Connecticut. The only public undergraduate institution in the City of Hartford, Capital's roots date to 1967 with the founding of Greater Hartford Community College. In 1992 Capital merged with Hartford State Technical College to become Capital Community-Technical College in a state-mandated consolidation. In 2000, the College's name was changed to Capital Community College.

The college is accredited by the New England Association of Schools and Colleges and enrolled 3,302 students in fall 2016.  It claims to be one of the most ethnically diverse campuses in New England. Sixty-seven percent of students are African American and Latino. Its programs of study include the associate degree in Nursing—the largest degree program for the preparation of Registered Nurses in the State of Connecticut.

The college made a significant step in helping the redevelopment in downtown Hartford by opening up a new campus at the former G. Fox & Co. department store on Main Street in the heart of downtown. The  building served as the home of the department store until it closed in 1993. The entire building was renovated and in 2002 the college moved into the building as well as numerous state and city offices and numerous retail clients on the ground level.

Before opening up in downtown Hartford the college had two campuses in the city, one on Woodland Street and another on Flatbush Avenue.

Notable alumni
Jaki Shelton Green, poet (Greater Hartford Community College)
 Pedro Segarra (Greater Hartford Community College), former mayor of Hartford

References

External links

Official website

Education in Hartford, Connecticut
Community colleges in Connecticut
Educational institutions established in 1967
Educational institutions established in 1992
Buildings and structures in Hartford, Connecticut
Universities and colleges in Hartford County, Connecticut
1967 establishments in Connecticut
1992 establishments in Connecticut